The 2020–21 Penn State Nittany Lions basketball team represented Pennsylvania State University in the 2020–21 NCAA Division I men's basketball season. They were led by interim head coach Jim Ferry and played their home games at the Bryce Jordan Center in University Park, Pennsylvania as members of the Big Ten Conference. They finished the season 11–14, 7–12 in Big Ten play to finish in a tie for 10th place. As the No. 10 seed in the Big Ten tournament, they defeated Nebraska before losing to Wisconsin in the second round.

On October 21, 2020, head coach Pat Chambers resigned after an internal investigation by the school into inappropriate conduct by Chambers. It had been reported in July that former player Rasir Bolton had left the program due to inappropriate comments to him by Chambers. New allegations surfaced after a later investigation by the school that led to Chambers resigning. Assistant coach Jim Ferry was named interim coach for the season.

Following the end of the season, the school hired Purdue assistant coach Micah Shrewsberry as head coach.

Previous season 
The Nittany Lions finished the 2019–20 season 21–10, 11–9 in Big Ten play to finish in a four-way tie for fifth place. Their season ended following the cancellation of postseason tournaments due to the coronavirus pandemic.

Offseason

Recruiting class

Roster

Coaching Staff

Schedule and results

|-
!colspan=9 style=|Regular season

|-
!colspan=9 style=|Big Ten regular season

|-
!colspan=9 style=|Big Ten tournament

References

Penn State Nittany Lions basketball seasons
Penn State
Penn State